Tamara Deutscher (1 February 1913 – 7 August 1990) was a Polish-British writer and editor who researched the leaders of Soviet Communism, together with her husband Isaac Deutscher.

She was born Tamara Lebenhaft in Łódź, in what was then Congress Poland. She was educated in Brussels and arrived in Britain after the fall of France to Nazi Germany.

Her first marriage to Hilary Frimer ended in divorce. She married Isaac Deutscher in June 1947.

She died in London.

See also 

 Isaac and Tamara Deutscher Memorial Prize

External links 
 Obituaries: Tamara Deutscher (1913-1990) In: Revolutionary History, Vol. 3 No. 3, Spring 1991
 Obituaries: Tamara Deutscher, Writer, 77 In: New York Times, 9 August 1990

British Trotskyists
20th-century British writers
Polish women writers
1913 births
1990 deaths
20th-century British women writers
British Jews
British people of Polish-Jewish descent
Jewish socialists
Polish emigrants to the United Kingdom